Barbençon is a village of Wallonia and a district of the municipality of Beaumont, located in the province of Hainaut, Belgium. 

The village is a member of the association Les Plus Beaux Villages de Wallonie.

From  1400, glass was produced in the village. In 1559 a larger glass factory was established here, active until around 1750. From 1678 until 1815 the village belonged to France. The village church dates from the 12th century and has a richly sculpted portal. There are remnants of medieval ramparts and a château from the Napoleonic era in the village, and a preserved fortified farm from the 17th century.

References

External links

Former municipalities of Hainaut (province)